Haploporus latisporus is a species of poroid white rot crust fungus in the family Polyporaceae. It is found in Central China, where it grows on decomposing pine twigs.

Taxonomy
The type collection of Haploporus latisporus was made in Jigongshan (Henan Province) in August 2005, and described as a new species in 2007. The specific epithet latisporus refers to its wide spores, which, at up to 10 μm, are the broadest in genus Haploporus.

Description
Fruit bodies of Haploporus septatus occur in small crust-like patches that are difficult to separate from the underlying substrate. The hymenophore, or pore surface, is white to cream coloured, darkening slightly in dry conditions. The round to angular pores number around two to three per millimetre.

The hyphal structure is dimitic to trimitic. The generative hyphae have clamp connections. The thick-walled, cylindrical spores are ornamented with warts (up to 2 μm long) and typically measure 13–16.5 by 8–10 μm.

References

Fungi described in 2007
Fungi of China
Polyporaceae
Taxa named by Yu-Cheng Dai